Holy Sepulchre Cemetery in Southfield, Michigan, is an American cemetery operated by the Roman Catholic Archdiocese of Detroit.

Notable people
Among the notable figures buried there are:
Larry Aurie, hockey player for the Detroit Red Wings
Vince Banonis, football player for the Detroit Lions
Vincent M. Brennan, U.S. Representative from Michigan
Anthony Giacalone, a Detroit Mafia Member & Suspect in the murder of Jimmy Hoffa
William Bufalino, Mafia Lawyer and Legal Counsel to Jimmy Hoffa, rumored member of the Mafia
Angelo Meli, a known member of the Detroit Mafia
William Tocco, known member of the Detroit Mafia
Walter Briggs Sr., owner of the Detroit Tigers
Al Cicotte, baseball player for the Detroit Tigers
Charles Coughlin, Roman Catholic priest and noted radio commentator during the 1930s and 1940s
John Francis Dearden, Archbishop of Detroit, 1958–1980, created Cardinal in 1969
John Dingell Sr., American politician
Charlie Gehringer, Hall of Fame baseball player for the Detroit Tigers
Walter Hagen, professional golfer, winner of eleven major championships
Harry Heilmann, Hall of Fame baseball player for the Detroit Tigers and Cincinnati Reds
Viola Liuzzo, American civil rights activist and murder victim
Edward Aloysius Mooney, Archbishop of Detroit, 1937–1958, created Cardinal in 1946
Francis Joseph Navin, principal owner of the Detroit Tigers  from 1908 to 1935
Dick Radatz, Major League Baseball relief pitcher
Jay Sebring, murder victim of the Manson Family
Edmund Szoka, Archbishop of Detroit, 1981–1990, created Cardinal in 1988
Vic Wertz, 4-time All-Star professional baseball player, he was the batter who hit the ball for Willie Mays' most famous catch

References

Roman Catholic cemeteries in Michigan
Cemeteries in Michigan